Burkmere is an unincorporated community in Faulk County, in the U.S. state of South Dakota.

History
Burkmere was laid out in 1886 or 1887. The community was named for John M. Burke, a railroad official. A post office operated under the name Burkmere from 1889 until 1951.

References

Unincorporated communities in Faulk County, South Dakota
Unincorporated communities in South Dakota